Marrufo is a surname. Notable people with the name include:

Jair Marrufo (born 1977), American soccer
José Marrufo (born 1996), Venezuelan footballer 
Omar Marrufo (born 1993), Mexican footballer 
Roberto Marrufo Torres (born 1949), Mexican politician 
William Marrufo, drummer for the band Ozomatli